"She Taught Me How to Fly" is a song by English rock band Noel Gallagher's High Flying Birds. Written by frontman Noel Gallagher, it was released on 25 May 2018 as the third single from the band's third studio album Who Built the Moon? (2017).

Music video
The official video for "She Taught Me How to Fly" was directed by Julian House. The video has a psychedelic feel and features Gallagher taking centre stage as he performs the song. The video also features a series of silhouettes. "She Taught Me How to Fly" was released on the band's Vevo account on 6 April 2018.

Track listing
12"

Digital

Charts

References

2017 songs
Noel Gallagher's High Flying Birds songs
Songs written by Noel Gallagher